Yaşar Altıntaş (born 10 March 1957) is a Turkish retired footballer who played as a forward. He appeared in the Süper Lig with MKE Ankaragücü and Kocaelispor.

Personal life
Yaşar's father Mustafa Altıntaş, his brother Yusuf Altıntaş, and his nephew Batuhan Altıntaş all have played professional football in the Turkish Süper Lig.

References

External links
 
 

1957 births
Living people
Turkish footballers
Sportspeople from İzmit
Association football forwards
Sakaryaspor footballers
Kocaelispor footballers
MKE Ankaragücü footballers
Süper Lig players
TFF First League players
TFF Second League players
TFF Third League players
20th-century Turkish people